Shiloh is the name of some places in the State of Virginia in the United States of America:
Shiloh, Bath County, Virginia
Shiloh, King George County, Virginia 
Shiloh, Pulaski County, Virginia 
Shiloh, Southampton County, Virginia 
Shiloh, Stafford County, Virginia 
Shiloh, Wythe County, Virginia